Thomas Mikkelsen may refer to:

 Thomas Mikkelsen (footballer, born 1983), Danish football goalkeeper
 Thomas Mikkelsen (footballer, born 1990), Danish football forward